Sagarika Chandani Gomes (19 October 1961 – 13 September 1989), was a Sri Lankan newscaster and aspiring artist, she worked for Rupavahini Corporation, the state run television channel.

Early life
She was born on 19 October 1961 at the Castle Women's Hospital, Colombo as the youngest of the family with four siblings. She developed her artistic skills while studying at the Presbyterian College, Dehiwala as well as at the Holy Family Convent in Dehiwala. She excelled dancing from Vajira Chitrasena. She entered public stage and in Nurti and Nadagam singing in which she sang the Nurti song Lona Muni Rajage Sri Dalada Penwami. During this time, she worked as a bookkeeper at the Towerhall Foundation. However, her free profession was the art of television broadcasting. While reading government news on the radio and television during the period of terror was a deadly ‘traitor’ act. She first traveled abroad to Calcutta in 1993 on a Towerhall Foundation scholarship to take a drama course. 

During the 1987–1989 JVP insurrection, employees of the Rupavahini Corporation and the Independent Television Network were ordered by an offshoot of the Janatha Vimukthi Peramuna (JVP), the Patriotic Liberation Organization (Deshapremi Janatha Viyaparaya) led by Saman Piyasiri Fernando to suspend news casting. Under threat, many of the newscasters refused to present the evening news. Deputy Minister of Information, A. J. Ranasinghe approach Sagarika Gomes to undertake presenting the evening news. She accepted and undertook the evening news.

Death
On 13 September 1989, some unknown persons rushed to her house and put her in the house and asked her many questions. Before moving with them, she took off her gold necklace and bracelet and put them in her father's hand. She was kidnapped from her home by a group of armed men. She was then taken to the beach and killed.She was not sexually assaulted. Later, the guards released the occupants exactly an hour later. Her murderers were never identified. Before the death, she is looking forward to starting her marriage with her boyfriend who is an army officer in a few days.

References

1989 deaths
Assassinated Sri Lankan journalists
People murdered in Sri Lanka
Sri Lankan murder victims
Gang rape in Sri Lanka
Deaths by firearm in Sri Lanka
Sri Lankan journalists
Kidnapped Sri Lankan people
Sinhalese people
Violence against women in Sri Lanka